The Ferguson-Calderara House is a historic house at 214 North 14th Street in Fort Smith, Arkansas.  It is a roughly rectangular -story wood-frame structure, with a high hip roof punctuated by large gables.  A single-story hip-roofed porch, supported by round modified Ionic columns with a decorative wooden balustrade between, extends across the front and along one side.  The front-facing gable has a Palladian window with diamond lights, and the left side of the second floor front facade has a former porch (now closed in with windows) with decorative pilasters and carved arch moldings. The house was built in 1904 for A. L. Ferguson, owner of one of Fort Smith's largest lumber companies.

The house was listed on the National Register of Historic Places in 1979.

See also
National Register of Historic Places listings in Sebastian County, Arkansas

References

Houses on the National Register of Historic Places in Arkansas
Colonial Revival architecture in Arkansas
Houses completed in 1904
Houses in Fort Smith, Arkansas
National Register of Historic Places in Sebastian County, Arkansas